The 1962 Super Prestige Pernod was the fourth edition of the Super Prestige Pernod, a season-long competition for road bicycle racing. It included nineteen races in Europe. Dutchman Jo de Roo of the  team won the overall title.

Races

Final standings

References

 
Super Prestige Pernod
Super Prestige Pernod
1962 in European sport